Jan Martinette (June 23, 1938 – October 27, 2020) was an American politician who served in the Missouri House of Representatives from the 47th district from 1985 to 1991.

She died on October 27, 2020, in Grandview, Missouri at age 82.

References

1938 births
2020 deaths
Republican Party members of the Missouri House of Representatives
Women state legislators in Missouri